Per Lövfors is a retired Swedish footballer. Lövfors made 87 Allsvenskan appearances for Djurgården and scored 16 goals.

References

Swedish footballers
Djurgårdens IF Fotboll players
Association footballers not categorized by position